The 2007 edition of the J.League Cup, officially the 2007 J.League Yamazaki Nabisco Cup, sponsored by Nabisco began on March 21 with reigning champions JEF United seeking to claim their 3rd successive crown.  This would equal the record set by Verdy Kawasaki when the competition began in 1992. The top 4 teams of each qualifying group automatically qualified for the quarterfinals with the best two remaining runners-up. Both Kawasaki Frontale and Urawa Red Diamonds were exempt from competing in the group stage, due to their entry into the Asian Champions League. They were therefore entered into the quarter-final stage which begins in the summer.

The final was on November 3 at the Tokyo National Stadium. The winners were Gamba Osaka, beating Kawasaki Frontale in the final 1-0 to claim its first J.League Cup championship. They qualified for the 2008 Pan-Pacific Championship and the 2008 Suruga Bank Championship.

Group stage

Group A

Group B

Group C

Group D

Knockout stage

Quarterfinals

Semifinals

Semifinals Match#1
Gamba Osaka and Kashima Antlers ties on the aggregate with 3 – 3; Gamba Osaka advance to the final on away goal rule.

Semifinals Match#2
Kawasaki Frontale advances to the final on aggregate score of 6 – 3.

Final

Awards
 MVP: Michihiro Yasuda (Gamba Osaka)
 Top Scorer: Daisuke Sudo (Ventforet Kofu); 6 goals.
 New Hero Prize: Michihiro Yasuda (Gamba Osaka)

External links
 J.LEAGUE The Official Site 

J.League Cup
2007
League Cup